Acacia dilatata is a shrub belonging to the genus Acacia and the subgenus Phyllodineae which is endemic to Western Australia.

Description
The multistemmed shrub can have a sprawling or compact habit. The dark-green to yellow-green phyllodes and have a length of  nd . It blooms from November to February and produces yellow flowers. The flower-heads have a spherical to obloid shape and contain 15 to 25 sub-densely packed golden flowers.

Distribution
It is native to an area close to the west coast in the Mid West and Wheatbelt regions of Western Australia. The bulk of the population is found from Geraldton in the north to Toodyay in the south. It is found on sandplains, clay flats and rocky lateritic ridges growing in sandy or clay soils. The bulk of the population is scattered from Mingenew south to Mogumber and is often a part of low shrubland or heath communities with scattered Eucalyptus and Banksia species.

See also
List of Acacia species

References

dilatata
Acacias of Western Australia
Taxa named by George Bentham
Plants described in 1855